The Ad Lib Club was a nightclub on the fourth floor of 7 Leicester Place over the Prince Charles Cinema in London's Soho district. It opened in February 1964 (or December 1963), and closed in its original location after a fire. The owner, Brian Morris, unsuccessfully tried to reopen the club in Covent Garden. The club was noted for its R&B and Soul music.

Mark Lewisohn describes the club as the nightclub "most strongly associated with The Beatles". The Beatles ended their evening at the club following the premiere of A Hard Day's Night in July 1964.
Cynthia and John Lennon and George Harrison and Pattie Boyd thought the lift going up to the club was on fire during their first LSD trip in 1965, an event which Harrison called "The Dental Experience". The Beatles had their own table at the club. It was at the club that Ringo Starr proposed to Maureen Cox in January 1965.

The musician and writer George Melly characterised the relationship between the entertainment and social elite of Swinging London and the rest of Britain's youth as "feudal" with "edicts handed down from the Ad Lib Club ... to the teeny boppers in the outer darkness".
The Ad Lib was supplanted in popularity by the Scotch of St. James.

References

1960s establishments in England
1960s disestablishments in England
Nightclubs in London
Soho, London